Climax Lourenco Lawrence (born 16 January 1979) is a retired Indian professional football midfielder. He last played for FC Bardez in the Goa Professional League in 2017.

National team
In 2002, he was called to the India national football team by coach Stephen Constantine and has since been a part. In the AFC Challenge Cup, he scored the winning goal in the 91st minute against Afghanistan to help India to a 1–0 victory. He retired from national team on 1 February 2012.

International statistics

International Goals

As member of AIFF
On 2 September 2022, Lawrence was elected as a co-opted member of the technical committee of the All India Football Federation.

Honours

India
 AFC Challenge Cup: 2008
 SAFF Championship: 2005, 2011; runner-up: 2008; third place: 2003
 Nehru Cup: 2007, 2009

Individual
 AIFF Player of the Year: 2005

Notes

External links
Player statistics at FIFA.com

Footballers from Goa
People from Margao
1979 births
Living people
Indian footballers
Dempo SC players
Indian Christians
India international footballers
India youth international footballers
2011 AFC Asian Cup players
I-League players
East Bengal Club players
Salgaocar FC players
Mumbai FC players
Association football midfielders
Footballers at the 2006 Asian Games
Asian Games competitors for India